Robert Lee Patterson (September 27, 1900 – February 21, 1993)  was an American football coach. He was the fourth head football coach at The Apprentice School in Newport News, Virginia and he held that position for the 1926 season.  His coaching record at Apprentice was 1–6.

References

External links
 

1900 births
1993 deaths
The Apprentice Builders football coaches